The International Film Festival of Ottawa (IFFO) is an international film festival, staged in Ottawa, Ontario, Canada, organized by the Canadian Film Institute that was to hold its inaugural edition from March 25 to March 29, 2020. The festival, launched as a replacement for the defunct Ottawa International Film Festival, was to present 20 feature films and 20 short films and to be held at the Ottawa Art Gallery and other venues in downtown Ottawa.

Due to the COVID-19 pandemic in Canada, the 2020 festival was not staged as planned; however, over the next several months the Canadian Film Institute organized and hosted a number of online talks and workshops under the Screen Summit banner. The festival was staged online in 2021, and launched its first in-person edition in March 2022.

The festival principally screens recent Canadian and international feature films, although each year's program also includes one or two historically or artistically significant films from the history of Canadian cinema. Most films screen along with a thematically-related short film as an opener, although a few films screen alone and are instead followed by a talk with the filmmaker.

Films

2021

Feature films

Short films

2022

Feature films

Short films

2023

Feature films

Short films

References

External links 

Film festivals in Ottawa
Impact of the COVID-19 pandemic on cinema
Film festivals established in 2020
2020 establishments in Ontario